Eccoptomenus is a genus of beetles in the family Carabidae, containing the following species:

 Eccoptomenus abessinicus (Csiki, 1931)
 Eccoptomenus eximius (Dejean, 1831)
 Eccoptomenus obscuricollis (Chaudoir, 1862)

References

Licininae